CWW may refer to:

 Camp Walt Whitman, Piermont, New Hampshire, USA; a summer camp
 Chak Waraichanwala railway station (rail station code: CWW), Pakistan
 Corowa Airport (IATA airport code: CWW; ICAO airport code: YCOR;), Corowa, New South Wales, Australia.
 Canair Cargo (ICAO airline code: CWW;), an airline of Canada; see List of defunct airlines of Canada
 Children Without Worms, a global program of the Task Force for Global Health
 Cable & Wireless Worldwide plc; a British multinational telecom company
 Columbia Walla Walla Railroad, in the state of Washington, USA; see List of Washington (state) railroads
 Claymore S&P Global Water ETF (stock ticker: CWW), see List of Canadian exchange-traded funds
 Computing With Words engine (CWW); a component for perceptual computing using Type-2 fuzzy sets and systems
 Cruciform wing weapon, see Cruciform wing
 Contaminated Water Warning, a warning code in the Specific Area Message Encoding

See also

 
 
 C2W
 CW2 (disambiguation)
 CW (disambiguation)
 CCW (disambiguation)
 C (disambiguation)
 W (disambiguation)
 WCW (disambiguation)
 WWC (disambiguation)